The 1950 Tangerine Bowl was an American college football bowl game played after the 1949 season, on January 2, 1950, at the Tangerine Bowl stadium in Orlando, Florida.  The game was the fourth annual Tangerine Bowl, now known as the Citrus Bowl, and saw the Saint Vincent defeat the Emory and Henry, 7–6. Both teams had entered the bowl undefeated. This game was the second Tangerine Bowl where MVP honors were awarded; they were given to fullback Don Henigin of Saint Vincent and quarterback Chick Davis of Emory and Henry.

Game summary
The only scoring was two touchdowns in the second quarter. Saint Vincent scored first, and converted their extra point for a 7–0 lead. Emory and Henry scored a touchdown as well, but missed the extra point, leaving the score 7–6 at halftime. After a scoreless second half, the missed extra point proved to be the margin of victory.

Scoring summary

Statistics

References

Further reading
 
 

Tangerine Bowl
Citrus Bowl (game)
Emory and Henry Wasps football
Saint Vincent Bearcats football
Tangerine Bowl
Tangerine Bowl